The Bureau of Counterterrorism and Countering Violent Extremism (CT) is a bureau of the United States Department of State. It coordinates all U.S. Government efforts to improve counter-terrorism cooperation with foreign governments and participates in the development, coordination, and implementation of American counterterrorism policy.

In June 2007, Ambassador-at-Large Dell Dailey was appointed to be the Coordinator for Counterterrorism. Under Secretary Hillary Clinton, the coordinator for counterterrorism from 2009 to 2012 was Ambassador-at-Large Daniel Benjamin. He was followed by Tina S. Kaidanow, from 2014 to 2016. The coordinator and special envoy for the Global Coalition to Counter the Islamic State of Iraq and the Levant between 2020 and 2021 was Nathan Sales.

Originally the Office for Combating Terrorism and later the Bureau of Counterterrorism, the bureau's name was expanded in 2016 to include countering violent extremism in its mandate.

Aims

The United States Counterterrorism Policy has four main aims:
 to make no concessions to terrorists and strike no deals;
 to bring terrorists to justice for their crimes;
 to isolate and apply pressure on states that sponsor terrorism to force them to change their behavior; and
 to bolster the counter-terrorism capabilities of those countries that work with the U.S. and require assistance.

Regarding international terrorism, the U.S. Government will make no concessions to individuals or groups holding official or private U.S. citizens hostage. The United States will use every appropriate resource to gain the safe return of American citizens held hostage. At the same time, it is U.S. Government policy to deny hostage takers the benefits of ransom, prisoner releases, policy changes, or other acts of concession.

History
An Office for Combatting Terrorism was created in the State Department in 1972 after the Munich Olympics terrorist attack. Its name and legal authorization has changed a few times, and it was renamed the Bureau of Counterterrorism in 2012.

In reaction to the State Department's 2004 proposal to omit terrorism figures from its Report to Congress, Larry C. Johnson stated that the State department was put in charge of coordinating counter-terrorism functions across government agencies by a presidential directive in 1986. Johnson wrote: 

The Department of State reorganized again in January 2012, elevating the former Office for the Coordinator for Counterterrorism to a bureau after the Quadrennial Diplomacy and Development Review

In early 2016, the Obama administration announced an overhaul in the bureau's programs in response to the growing threat of the Islamic State of Iraq and the Levant. Among the changes planned is the reorganization of the bureau into the Bureau of Counterterrorism and Countering Violent Extremism.

See also 
 Coordinator for Counterterrorism

References

External links
 Bureau of Counterterrorism

CT
Counterterrorism in the United States
1976 establishments in the United States
Government agencies established in 1976